İmren Aykut (born 1940) is a Turkish female economist, trade unionist, politician and former government minister.

Early years
Aykut was born to Evket Şadi and his wife Emine in Kozan, Adana, Turkey in 1940. She finished the primary education st Atatürk Elementary School, and the middle education at Adana Girls' High School. She studied at the Faculty of Economics in Istanbul University graduating in 1964.

Aykut specialized in "Employer-Employee relations", "Industrial relations" and  Trade unionism at the University of Oxford in England. She completed a programme on "Executive Participation of Workers" at the University of Oslo in Norway. She also conducted research on "Arbitration and Mediation" in the United States, "Structure of Workers' Unions and Training of Workers" in England. Further, she carried out various researches and studies at the Confederation of Union and the Department of Labour in the United Kingdom. She received a PhD degree from Istanbul University with her thesis "Exchange Rates for Workers (outside Turkey) and Its Analysis from the View of Turkish Economy".

Professional career
Aykut served in two trade unions as department manager for collective bargaining and research between 1964 and 1975, as industrial relations specialist at Şişecam from 1975 to 1976, and secretary general of the Trade Union of Paper Industry Employer between 1976-1983.

In politics
Ayjut was appointed member of the Advisory Parliament of Turkey in 1981. She was among the charter members of the Nationalist Democracy Party (MDP) in 1983. After the party's dissolution in 1986, she joined the Motherland Party (ANAP).

She was elected to the parliament in the general elections of 1987, 1991, 1995 as deputy from Istanbul and 1999 from Adana. She served as Minister of Labour and Social Security in the cabinets of Turgut Özal and Yıldırım Akbulut from 21 December 1987 to 23 June 1991. Her next appointment as minister was State Minister in two cabinets of Mesut Yılmaz at the 48th and 53rd governments. Aykut was appointed Minister of Environment and Urban Planning in the Cabinet of Mesut Yılmaz on 23 June 1991. Her term ended on 20 November 1991.

She is the first ever Turkish female government minister, who came to this position after entering the parliament by general election.

References

1940 births
People from Kozan, Adana
Istanbul University alumni
Turkish women economists
Turkish economists
Labor economists
Turkish trade unionists
Motherland Party (Turkey) politicians
Deputies of Istanbul
Deputies of Adana
Women government ministers of Turkey
Government ministers of Turkey
Ministers of Labour and Social Security of Turkey
Ministers of Environment and Urban Planning of Turkey
Members of the 17th Parliament of Turkey
Members of the 18th Parliament of Turkey
Members of the 19th Parliament of Turkey
Members of the 20th Parliament of Turkey
Members of the 46th government of Turkey
Members of the 47th government of Turkey
Members of the 48th government of Turkey
Members of the 53rd government of Turkey
Members of the 55th government of Turkey
Living people
Ministers of State of Turkey
Turkish expatriates in the United Kingdom
Turkish expatriates in Norway
20th-century Turkish women politicians